It's Still Living is a live album by The Birthday Party recorded at The Astor Theatre in St Kilda, Victoria on 15 January 1982, and released in May 1985. The initial LP release in 1985 by the band's former manager and backer Keith Glass, on his Missing Link label, was not sanctioned by the band. The sound quality of the recording is poor and it is marred by technical glitches (mainly the sounds of the amps crackling and shorting out). In 1991 the album was re-released on the Virgin label, with the LP being released on green vinyl.

The photograph of the band was taken by Peter Milne on the Birthday Party's first trip back home after taking up residency in London. This shoot was in the studio of Victoria College in High Street, Prahran. According to the album liner notes film footage of the concert was shot by Paul Goldman and Evan English (aka The Rich Kids). The footage, however, has never been released.

Track listing

Personnel

Birthday Party
 Phill Calvert – drums
 Nick Cave – vocals
 Mick Harvey – guitar
 Rowland Howard – guitar
 Tracy Pew – bass

Credits
 Engineer – Chris Thompson
 Mixed – The Birthday Party, Tony Cohen
 Artwork – James McDonald
 Photography – Peter Milne

Chart positions

Release history

References

External links
 [ It's Still Living] @ Allmusic
 It's Still Living @ Discogs
 It's Still Living @ MusicBrainz
 Birthday Party archived from the original on 30 September 2012 @ Australian Rock Database

The Birthday Party (band) albums
1985 live albums